Rebelles Européens was a French independent record label that operated between 1987 and 1994, specialising in white power rock and Rock Against Communism. Based in the port city of Brest, the label was founded by Gaël Bodilis, a member of far-right groups including the Front Nationale Jeunesse, Troisième Voie, and PNFE. Rebelles Européens was, alongside German label Rock-O-Rama Records, a key player within the international white power skinhead music scene during the late 1980s and early 1990s. Unlike Rock-O-Rama, whose owner was apolitical and commercially minded, Bodilis primarily conceived of Rebelles Européens as a means for spreading neo-fascist ideology, and denied any interest in the profitability of his enterprise. Rebelles Europeéns was notable for its brazen inclusion of Nazi and white-supremacist symbols on album covers; Robert Forbes and Eddie Stampton suggest that the label "seemed to operate without regard to the law". After a pause on production in 1993, Rebelles Europeéns went out of business in 1994, with Australian label White League reissuing a small number of their releases on CD in 1995.

Between 1987 and 1994, Rebelles Européens released forty-five twelve-inch records and thirty seven-inch records. The label also sold recordings of Nazi military music and other white power merchandise including shirts and books.

Albums

Singles
 RE450187 Legion 88 'Terroristes'
 RE450287 Bunker 84 'Vieux Continent'
 RE450387 Brutal Combat 'Passe A L'oueste'
 RE450487 Bunker 84 'Victime Des Democraties'
 RE450588 Legion 88 'Terroristes'/'Vaincre' (2nd pressing, 300 copies made)
 RE450689 Lionheart 'Better Dead Than Red'
 RE450789 Chauves Pourris 'Censure'
 RE450889 Peggior Amico 'Copevole Di Essere Bianco'
 RE450989 Public Enemy 'Waiting For The Storm'/'Saturday Night's Alright For Fighting (Reg 'Elton John' Dwight cover)
 RE451089 Kontingent 88 '1789/Mohamed'
 RE451189 No Remorse 'Time Will Tell'/'Solly'
 RE451289 No Remorse 'Smash The Reds'/Race Traitor'
 RE451389 Power Skins 'Mittel Europa'
 RE451489 English Rose 'Proud Nationalist Warriors'
 RE451589 Battlezone 'Way Of Death'/'National Sorrow'
 RE451690 Nouvelle Criosade 'Tu Aimeras'
 RE451790 Verde Bianco Rosso "Bionda Rossa E Nera'
 RE451890 Battlezone 'Right To March'/'Squalor'
 RE451990 Public Enemy 'For You'/'The Oath'
 RE452090 Lionheart 'Sign Of The Times'
 RE452190 Dirlewanger 'Nigger Season'/'Proud Of My Race'
 RE452290 Violent Storm "Land Of My Fathers'
 RE452390 Division S 'Efter Revolutionen'
 RE452490 Public Enemy 'Salute'/'White Nation Rock'
 RE452591 Legion 88 'Legion Blanche'
 RE452691 Ultima Thule 'Havets Vargar'
 RE452791 Grade One 'Hail The New Land'
 RE452891 Ultime Assaut 'Paris'
 RE452991 Peggior Amico 'Diritto Di Marciare'
 RE453092 Ovaltinees 'British Justice E.P.'
 RECD0191 Noie Werte 'Kraft Fur Deutschland'
 RECD0291 Battlezone 'Nowhere To Hide'
 RECD0391 Paul Burnley & The 4th Reich 'A Nation Reborn'
 RECD0492 No Remorse 'This Time The World'
 RECD0592 Ultima Thule 'Svea Hjaltar'
 RECD44 Debout Vol. 6 Oi Oi! Skins (Ovaltinees/Kontingent/Battlezone/Power Skins/Lionheart/Grade One/Legion 88/Chauves Pourris/Vengeance/ABH/Diehards/Quick & The Dead)
 CDs "WHITE LEAGUE" label:
 WL9501 Public Enemy 'There Is Only One Public Enemy'
 WL9502 Legion 88 'Thule'
 WL9503 100 Birthday
 WL9504 Dirlewanger S/T
 WL9505 Bunker 84 "Notre Combat'
 WL9506 Kontingent 88 "Au Service De Nos Ancetres'
 WL9507 Public Enemy 'Our Weapon Is Thuth'
 WL7 Legion 88/Open Season split 7-inch

See also
 List of record labels

French record labels
Record labels established in 1987
Record labels disestablished in 1994
Neo-Nazi record labels
Neo-Nazism in France